Zhu Zhengting (born March 18, 1996) is a Chinese singer and actor. He took part in the talent show Produce 101 Season 2 in 2017, and debuted as a member of limited boy band Nine Percent on April 6, 2018 through the Chinese talent show Idol Producer. He is currently the leader and main dancer of Yuehua's NEXT.

Early career
At the age of 8, he studied Chinese Traditional dance, When he turned 12, he studied ballet, and at 15, he then majored in modern and contemporary dance.

In 2014, Zhu admitted into the Shanghai Theatre Academy as the first Chinese dance major, after winning first place in the Chinese Dance Theater Competition of National Vocational Vocal Skills Competition. Zhengting was a trainee in Yuehua Entertainment before his debut as an artist in the same company.

Career

2017: Produce 101
Zhu participated in boy group survival reality show, "Produce 101" which aired on Mnet in 2017. He was eventually eliminated on episode 8 with a total vote of 330,058.

2018-Present: Idol Producer, debut with Nine Percent, NEXT and solo activities
After his elimination in the Korean series Produce 101 Season 2, he participated in a similar Chinese survival boy band show, Idol Producer. Zhu's performance in the show brought his rise to fame, and eventually garnered a total of 11,938,786 votes in the last episode. He debuted as a member of project group "Nine Percent" after placing sixth overall.

On June 21, 2018, Zhu debuted as the leader of C-Pop group "NEXT" with the song "Wait a Minute". On June 23, 2018, Zhu and other members of NEXT held their first fan meeting in Beijing, China.

On December 2, 2018 Yuehua Entertainment confirmed that Zhu would be releasing his first solo single titled "The Winter Light" the following day and that he would also be releasing a single early next year. The single sold over one million digital copies within the first three minutes of its release and over two million within an hour. Following "The Winter Light", Zhu released a single titled "Green Christmas".

On March 18, 2019, Zhu released a new single called "待签收" (English: Waiting to be Signed).

On September 16, 2019  the first teaser for his first solo mini album came out. The single "Flip" came out on September 23, followed by the rest of the songs "都要好好的" and "旁观者" on September 27. Within six days of release Chapter Z became the best selling music on Netease of the year with 10 million albums sold.

On October 3, 2019 the teaser for the music video for "Flip" came out, with the official music video dropping on October 10.

On May 6, 2020 he came out with his new single "Empty Space" featuring his ex-groupmate from Nine Percent rapper Wang Ziyi.

He released a new single on his birthday March 18, 2021 titled "陷" (Trap) on Netease Music selling 100,000 copies on the first 28 minutes.

He was also named as the ambassador of Shanghai Public and Safety Officer.

Effective May 22, 2021 Zhu Zhengting was named and appointed as the "Protector of Endangered Species" by Society of Entrepreneurs & Ecology (SEE).

On January 30, 2022 his first drama "Floating Youth" officially came out. The drama is dedicated to the 2022 Beijing Winter Olympics, and centers around a university hockey team. 

He is appointed by Tencent as the "Fashion Star Officer" for Paris Fashion Week 2022.

Endorsements 
In 2018, Zhengting was chosen by multiple brands. He endorsed hygiene products such as Head & Shoulders and Oral-B as well as clothing brand Calvin Klein, technology giant Huawei and beauty brands Olay and Perfect Diary. In 2019, He was signed under Paul Frank and he also endorsed products by leading camera manufacturer Canon and beauty brands Nivea among others.

In 2020, Zhengting continuously to be brand ambassadors such as Hugo Boss, Fuguang, Marubi, Chow sang sang, Watson's, Rio, Kimberlite Diamond, Estée Lauder, Gucci, Valentino  et al.

In 2021, he added LANEIGE, ISDIN, Vans, Meco to his endorsements.

As of 2022, his active endorsements are with Tissot, SSR Yoghurt , and UNNY CLUB. He is also the spokesperson for Youku VIP membership.

Discography

Album and Extended plays

Singles

Filmography

Films

Television series

Television / Variety shows

Awards

Notes

References

External links 
 Instagram
 Weibo

1996 births
Living people
People from Ma'anshan
Shanghai Theatre Academy alumni
Produce 101 contestants
Idol Producer contestants
Nine Percent members
Singers from Anhui
Male actors from Anhui
21st-century Chinese male singers
21st-century Chinese male actors
Chinese male dancers
Chinese male film actors